KDAM (94.3 FM) is a hot adult contemporary radio station serving Yankton and Vermillion, South Dakota area that is licensed to Hartington, Nebraska.  KDAM is owned and operated by Riverfront Broadcasting LLC.

History

KDAM began broadcasting in 2010, and originally aired an active rock format branded "the Dam". In 2017, the station adopted a hot AC format branded "Current 94.3", while "the Dam's" active rock format continued to stream online.

References

External links
Current 94.3's website
The Dam's website

DAM
Hot adult contemporary radio stations in the United States
Riverfront Broadcasting LLC
Radio stations established in 2010
2010 establishments in Nebraska